Arthur Christopher Benson,  (24 April 1862 – 17 June 1925) was an English essayist, poet and academic, and the 28th Master of Magdalene College, Cambridge. He wrote the lyrics of Edward Elgar’s Coronation Ode, including the words of the patriotic song "Land of Hope and Glory" (1902). His literary criticism, poems, and volumes of essays were highly regarded. He was also noted as an author of ghost stories.

Early life and family
Benson was born on 24 April 1862 at Wellington College, Berkshire as one of six children of Edward White Benson (1829–1896), Archbishop of Canterbury from 1883 to 1896 and, before that, the first headmaster of the college. His mother, Mary Sidgwick Benson, was a sister of the philosopher Henry Sidgwick.

Benson's literary family included his brothers Edward Frederic Benson, best remembered for his Mapp and Lucia novels, and Robert Hugh Benson, a priest of the Church of England before converting to Roman Catholicism, who wrote many popular novels. Their sister Margaret Benson was an artist, author, and amateur Egyptologist.

Though exceptionally accomplished, the Benson family met tragic times: a son and daughter died young, while another daughter and Arthur himself suffered from a mental condition that may have been bipolar disorder or manic-depressive psychosis, seemingly inherited from their father. None of the children married.

Despite his illness, Arthur was to become a distinguished academic and a prolific author. From the ages of 10 to 21, he lived in cathedral closes, first at Lincoln where his father was Chancellor of Lincoln Cathedral, and then at Truro, where his father was the first Bishop of Truro. He retained a love of church music and ceremony.

In 1874 he won a scholarship to Eton from Temple Grove School, a preparatory school in East Sheen. In 1881 he went up to King's College, Cambridge, where he was a scholar (King's College had closed scholarships for which only Etonians were eligible) and achieved first-class honours in the Classical tripos in 1884.

Career
From 1885 to 1903 Benson taught at Eton, but returned to Cambridge in 1904 as a Fellow of Magdalene College to lecture in English Literature. He became president of the college (the Master's deputy) in 1912, and he was Master of Magdalene (head of the college) from December 1915 until his death in 1925. From 1906, he was a governor of Gresham's School.

Modern development of Magdalene was shaped by Benson, as a generous benefactor with a marked impact on the appearance of the college grounds; he appears in at least 20 inscriptions round the college. In 1930, the new Benson Court was named after him.

Benson worked with Lord Esher in editing the correspondence of Queen Victoria, which appeared in 1907. His poems and essay volumes, such as From a College Window and The Upton Letters (essays in the form of letters) were famous in his time; and he left one of the longest diaries ever written: some four million words. His literary criticisms of Dante Gabriel Rossetti, Edward FitzGerald, Walter Pater and John Ruskin rank among his best work.

Benson wrote the lyrics of the Coronation Ode, set to music by Edward Elgar for the 1902 coronation of King Edward VII and Queen Alexandra. It has as its finale one of Britain's best-known patriotic songs, "Land of Hope and Glory".

Like his brothers Edward Frederic and Robert Hugh, Benson was noted as an author of ghost stories. The bulk of them, in two volumes, The Hill of Trouble and Other Stories (1903) and The Isles of Sunset (1904), were written for his pupils as moral allegories. After Arthur's death, Fred Benson found a collection of unpublished ghost stories and included two in a book, Basil Netherby (1927). The title story was renamed "House at Treheale" and the volume completed by a long piece, "The Uttermost Farthing", but the fate of the other stories is unknown. Paul the Minstrel and Other Stories (1911, reprinted 1977) collects the contents of The Hill of Trouble and Other Stories and The Isles of Sunset. Nine of Arthur's ghost stories are included in David Stuart Davies (ed.), The Temple of Death: The Ghost Stories of A. C. & R. H. Benson (Wordsworth, 2007), together with seven by his brother R. H. Benson, while nine of Arthur's and ten of Robert's appear in Ghosts in the House (Ash-Tree, 1996) – the contents of the joint collections are similar but not identical.

Views
In The Schoolmaster, Benson summarised his views on education after 18 years' experience at Eton. He criticised a trend he found prevalent in English public schools, to "make the boys good and to make them healthy" to the detriment of their intellectual development.

A Fellow of the Royal Society of Literature, he founded the Benson Medal in 1916 "in respect of meritorious works in poetry, fiction, history and belles lettres".

Death

A. C. Benson died of cardiac arrest at Magdalene and was buried at St Giles's Cemetery in Cambridge.

Critical reception
Horror critic R. S. Hadji included Benson's Basil Netherby on a list of "unjustly neglected" horror books.

Sir Arthur Quiller-Couch included Benson's poem "The Phoenix" in the first and second editions of The Oxford Book of English Verse.

Works

Men of Might: Studies of Great Characters, with H. F. W. Tatham, 1892
Le Cahier Jaune: Poems, 1892
Poems, 1893
Genealogy of the Family of Benson of Banger House and Northwoods, in the Parish of Ripon and Chapelry of Pateley Bridge, 1894
Lyrics, 1895
Lord Vyet & Other Poems, 1898
Ode in Memory of the Rt. Honble. William Ewart Gladstone, 1898
Thomas Gray, 1895
Essays, 1896.
Fasti Etonenses: A Biographical History of Eton, 1899
The Professor: and Other Poems, 1900
The Schoolmaster, 1902
The Hill of Trouble and Other Stories, 1903
The Isles of Sunset, 1904
(as editor) Ionica by William Cory, 3rd edition, 1905
Peace: and Other Poems, 1905
The Upton Letters, 1905
The Gate of Death: A Diary, 1906
From a College Window, 1906
Monnow: An Ode, 1906
Rossetti, 1906
Walter Pater, 1906
The Thread of Gold, 1907
Memoirs of Arthur Hamilton, 1907
The House of Quiet: An Autobiography, 1907
The Altar Fire, 1907
The Letters of One, a Study in Limitations, 1907
Beside Still Waters, 1908
At Large, 1908
Tennyson, 1908
Until the Evening, 1909
The Poems of A. C. Benson, 1909
The Child of the Dawn, 1911
Paul the Minstrel and Other Stories, 1911
The Leaves of the Tree: Studies in Biography, 1911
Ruskin: A Study in Personality, 1911
The Letters of Queen Victoria, 1907
Thy Rod and Thy Staff, 1912
The Beauty of Life: Being Selections from the Writings of Arthur Christopher Benson, 1912
Joyous Gard, 1913
The Silent Isle, 1913
Along the Road, 1913
Where No Fear Was: A Book About Fear, 1914
The Orchard Pavilion, 1914
Escape and Other Essays, 1916
Meanwhile; A Packet of War Letters, 1916
Father Payne, 1917
Life and Letters of Maggie Benson, 1920
Watersprings, 1920
Hugh: Memoirs of a Brother, 1920
The Reed of Pan; English Renderings of Greek Epigrams and Lyrics, 1922
Magdalene College, Cambridge: A Little View of Its Buildings and History, 1923
Selected Poems, 1924
Chris Gascoyne; An Experiment in Solitude, from the Diaries of John Trevor, 1924
Everybody's Book of the Queen's Dolls' House, 1924
Memories and Friends, 1924
Edward Fitzgerald, 1925
The House of Menerdue, 1925
Rambles and Reflections, 1926
Basil Netherby, 1926
The Diary of Arthur Christopher Benson, 1926

Reviews of Benson's poetry
"The Poetry of Mr. A. C. Benson", Sewanee Review, Volume 14 (Sewanee: University of the South, 1906), 110–111, 405–421.
"Poets All", The Speaker, Volume 15, 13 February 1897 (London), 196
"Mr. Benson's Poems", The Literary World, Volume 48, 3 November 1893 (London: James Clarke & Co.), 329
"Selected Poetry of Arthur Christopher Benson" (1862–1925)
"A Literary Causerie" in The Speaker, Volume 15, 13 March 1897 (London), 299

References

Citations

Sources

Edward Hewish Ryle (1925), Arthur Christopher Benson as Seen by Some Friends, London: G. Bell and Sons

Keith Wilson (1990), "A. C. Benson," Robert Beum, ed., Dictionary of Literary Biography: British Essayists, 1880–1960. Detroit: Gale, 192–204.

External links

Works by A.C. Benson, at Hathi Trust
Essays by Arthur Benson at Quotidiana.org
Representative Poetry Online

Benson, Arthur Christopher (1862–1925)

1862 births
1925 deaths
People educated at Eton College
Alumni of King's College, Cambridge
Masters of Magdalene College, Cambridge
Anglican writers
English diarists
English essayists
English horror writers
Ghost story writers
Fellows of the Royal Society of Literature
English LGBT poets
People educated at Temple Grove School
British male essayists
English male poets
Councillors in Cambridgeshire
AC
English male non-fiction writers
People with bipolar disorder